Sea Hunter is an autonomous unmanned surface vehicle (USV) launched in 2016 as part of the DARPA Anti-Submarine Warfare Continuous Trail Unmanned Vessel (ACTUV) program. The ship was christened 7 April 2016 in Portland, Oregon. It was built by Vigor Industrial. The vessel continues the line of experimental "Sea" ships, including Sea Shadow, Sea Fighter, Sea Jet, and Sea Slice. Sea Hunter is classified as a Class III USV and designated the Medium Displacement Unmanned Surface Vehicle (MDUSV).

Description
The initially unarmed prototype, built at a cost of twenty million dollars, is a 132-foot (40 meter)-long trimaran (a central hull with two outriggers). Her weight is 135 tons, including 40 tons of fuel, adequate for a 70-day cruise. The trimaran hull provides increased stability without requiring a weighted keel, giving her a higher capacity for linear trajectories and better operations in shallow waters, though the greater width decreases maneuverability.

A removable operator control station is installed during the testing period "for safety and backup" until it can be determined to reliably operate on her own. Operationally, computers will drive and control the ship, with a human always observing and taking charge if necessary in a concept called Sparse Supervisory Control, meaning a person is in control, but not "joy sticking" the vessel around. The system can patrol without human guidance, using optical guidance and radar to avoid hitting obstacles or other watercraft. The ship has a host of non-standard features because of her lack of crew, including an internal layout that offers enough room for maintenance to be performed but not for any people to be permanently present. It is fitted with quicKutter shaft protection rope/line cutters from Quickwater Marine in Perth; these devices protect the vessel from damage caused by rope or net caught by the propellers, without affecting the vessel's performance.

The craft is expected to undergo two years of testing before being placed in service with the U.S. Navy. If tests are successful, future craft of this type may be armed and used for anti-submarine and counter-mine duties, operating at a cost of $15,000–20,000 per day, a fraction of the cost of a destroyer at $700,000 per day (in 2015); it could operate with Littoral Combat Ships, becoming an extension of the LCS ASW module. Deputy U.S. Defense Secretary Robert Work said that if weapons are added to the ship, a human would always remotely make the decision to use lethal force.

Following successful initial development, it was reported on 1 February 2018 that DARPA had handed development of Sea Hunter to the Office of Naval Research (ONR).

Sea trials and operations

On 22 June 2016, Sea Hunter completed initial performance trials, meeting or surpassing all performance objectives for speed, maneuverability, stability, seakeeping, acceleration/deceleration, fuel consumption, and mechanical systems reliability in the open-ocean. Upcoming trials will include testing of sensors, the vessel's autonomy suite, compliance with maritime collision regulations, and proof-of-concept demonstrations for a variety of U.S. Navy missions. Sea Hunter was sent to the ONR in summer 2017 for operational testing and evaluation for mine-countermeasure, EO/IR, and submarine detection capabilities. Plans for FY 2018 include adding intelligence, surveillance and reconnaissance (ISR) and offensive anti-submarine payloads.

Influence
It has been reported in 2020 that the People's Republic of China was building clones of Sea Hunter.

References

External links 
 

Unmanned surface vehicles of USA
Experimental ships of the United States Navy
DARPA projects
Ships built in Portland, Oregon
2016 ships
Autonomous ships